Khalifeh Kandi (also Romanized as Khalīfeh Kandī; also known as Ḩamīdīyeh, Hātam, Khalfa, Khalīeh Kandī-ye Ḩātam, Khalīfeh, and Khalīfeh Kandī-ye Ḩātam) is a village in Nazarkahrizi Rural District, Nazarkahrizi District, Hashtrud County, East Azerbaijan Province, Iran. At the 2006 census, its population was 379, in 64 families.

References 

Towns and villages in Hashtrud County